Elderton is a borough in Armstrong County, Pennsylvania, United States. The population was 334 at the 2020 census.

Geography
U.S. Route 422 leads northwest  to Kittanning and southeast  to the borough of Indiana.

Demographics

As of the census of 2000, there were 358 people, 145 households, and 107 families residing in the borough. The population density was 1,293.0 people per square mile (493.7/km2). There were 156 housing units at an average density of 563.4 per square mile (215.1/km2). The racial makeup of the borough was 99.44% White, 0.28% African American, and 0.28% from two or more races.

There were 145 households, out of which 30.3% had children under the age of 18 living with them, 59.3% were married couples living together, 6.9% had a female householder with no husband present, and 26.2% were non-families. 24.8% of all households were made up of individuals, and 10.3% had someone living alone who was 65 years of age or older. The average household size was 2.42 and the average family size was 2.82.

The borough median age of 40 years was the same as the county median age. The distribution by age group was 22.3% under the age of 18, 11.2% from 18 to 24, 26.0% from 25 to 44, 19.8% from 45 to 64, and 20.7% who were 65 years of age or older. The median age was 40 years. For every 100 females, there were 93.5 males. For every 100 females age 18 and over, there were 86.6 males.

The median income for a household in the borough was $36,000, and the median income for a family was $43,750. Males had a median income of $37,917 versus $23,021 for females. The per capita income for the borough was $18,805. About 3.6% of families and 5.0% of the population were below the poverty line, including 7.0% of those under age 18 and 11.0% of those age 65 or over.

Cemeteries
Elderton Cemetery
Elderton Presbyterian Church Cemetery
Elderton United Methodist Church Cemetery

See also
 Elderton High School

References

Populated places established in 1822
Pittsburgh metropolitan area
Boroughs in Armstrong County, Pennsylvania
1859 establishments in Pennsylvania
1822 establishments in Pennsylvania